9 Malabar Hill is a television show broadcast on Zee TV in 1997–1998. The drama show was edited and directed by Siddharth Sengupta, produced by Sanjay Datta  written by Saurabh Shukla, with Pavan Malhotra and Renuka Shahane in lead roles.

Premise 
9 Malabar Hill is the story of the people living on the island of Sindwa, situated about the outskirts of Mumbai (then Bombay), during the pre-independent times in India.

Cast 
 Pavan Malhotra
 Renuka Shahane
 Deepika Deshpande Amin
 Aditya Srivastava
 Alka Kaushal
 Sandeep Kulkarni
 Shilpa Tulaskar
 Saurabh Shukla
 Krishankant Sinha as Bhushan

References

External links 
Watch episodes from 9 Malabar Hill
 

Zee TV original programming
1997 Indian television series debuts
1998 Indian television series endings
Television shows set in Maharashtra
Television shows set in the British Raj
Indian drama television series
Hindi-language television shows